Deepti Divakar (born 31 October 1958) is an Indian model and winner of Miss India in 1981.

Early life and career

Divakar was born in Bangalore. Her grandfather, Dr R.R. Diwakar, was India's first Information and Broadcasting minister and Governor of Bihar. She studied interior design at Parsons School of Design, New York and University of California, Los Angeles.  She has a Bachelor of Architecture degree from Bangalore University and a Master of Arts degree in radio and television from San Francisco State University.

Divakar has performed the classical Indian dance bharatanatyam in India, Europe and the United States.  The World Development Parliament of West Bengal awarded her a national award in this endeavor, "Bharatha Natyam Maharathnam".

References

1958 births
Female models from Bangalore
Miss World 1981 delegates
Femina Miss India winners
Living people
UCLA School of the Arts and Architecture alumni
Parsons School of Design alumni
San Francisco State University alumni